Hassan Noureddine Oumari (born 11 August 1986) is a football player, coach and futsal player who plays as a midfielder for and is the assistant coach of German club CFC Hertha 06. Born in Germany, Oumari is of Lebanese descent; he represented Lebanon internationally at senior level in 2016.

Personal life 
Oumari was born on 11 August 1986 in Berlin, Germany, to Lebanese Kurds from Beirut. Oumari's parents emigrated from Lebanon to Germany in 1980 due to the Lebanese Civil War. He has two brothers, Ahmed and Joan; the latter also plays football.

Honours
Reinickendorfer Füchse
 Berlin-Liga: 2007–08

Berliner FC Dynamo
 NOFV-Oberliga Nord runner-up: 2009–10
 Berlin Cup runner-up: 2009–10

Safa
 Lebanese FA Cup runner-up: 2010–11

Tripoli
 Lebanese FA Cup runner-up: 2013–14

1. FC Novi Pazar 95
 Kreisliga A Berlin runner-up: 2013–14

FSV Optik Rathenow
 NOFV-Oberliga Nord: 2014–15

Nejmeh
 Lebanese FA Cup: 2015–16; runner-up: 2017–18
 Lebanese Elite Cup: 2017

See also
 List of Lebanon international footballers born outside Lebanon
 List of association football families

References

External links
 
 
  (2008–2013)
  (2013–2019)
  (2015–2016)
 Hassan Oumari at FuPa.net
 

1986 births
Living people
Footballers from Berlin
Lebanese people of Kurdish descent
German people of Kurdish descent
German people of Lebanese descent
Kurdish sportspeople
Lebanese footballers
Lebanese men's futsal players
German footballers
German men's futsal players
Association football midfielders
Füchse Berlin Reinickendorf players
SV Babelsberg 03 players
Berliner FC Dynamo players
Brandenburger SC Süd 05 players
Safa SC players
FC Viktoria 1889 Berlin players
Torgelower FC Greif players
AC Tripoli players
1. FC Neukölln players
FSV Optik Rathenow players
Nejmeh SC players
FV Preussen Eberswalde players
CFC Hertha 06 players
Regionalliga players
Oberliga (football) players
Lebanese Premier League players
Lebanon international footballers
Lebanese football managers
German football managers
1. FC Neukölln managers
Landesliga managers